Janusz Czesław Wojciechowski (born 6 December 1954 in Rawa Mazowiecka) is a Polish politician and was a long-standing Member of the European Parliament, elected from the Lodz Voivodship representing the Polish People's Party (PSL) (2004–2006), the Polish People's Party "Piast" (PSL "Piast") (2006–2010) and, lately, Law and Justice (since 2010). In 2016, he left the parliament to become a member of the Court of Auditors. Since 2019 he has been the European Commissioner for Agriculture.

Wojciechowski was member of United People's Party, a Member of the Bureau of the European People's Party (EPP) from 2004 to 2006 and was vice-chair of the European Parliament's Committee on Agriculture and Rural Development. Wojciechowski was dismissed from his PSL party following his decision to leave the EPP for the Union for Europe of the Nations EU parliamentary grouping. Wojciechowski was a substitute for the Committee on Budgetary Control and a member of the Delegation to the EU-Kazakhstan, EU-Kyrgyzstan and EU-Uzbekistan Parliamentary Cooperation Committees, and for relations with Tajikistan, Turkmenistan and Mongolia.

He ran on the Law and Justice list in the 2009 election, despite not being a party member.  In November 2010, he joined Law and Justice.

Career
 1977–1980: Articled to the public prosecutor
 1980–1993: Judge on the district court of Rawa Mazowiecka, judge on the provincial court of Skierniewice, judge on the appellate court of Warsaw
 1995–2001: President of the Supreme Chamber of Control
 1993–1995, 2001–2004: Member of Parliament of the Polish Republic
 1994–1995: Under-secretary of State at the Cabinet Office for legislative affairs
 1995–1999: Member of the Administration of EUROSAI – European Organisation of Supreme Audit Institutions
 2001–2004: Vice-marshal of the Parliament of the Republic of Poland, Chairman of the Codifying Changes Committee
 2003-2002: Member of the Chief Executive Committee of the Polish People's Party (PSL)
 2004–2005: Chairman PSL
 2003–2004: Observer to the EP
 2004-2016: Member of the EP
 2016-2019: Member of the European Court of Auditors
 2019-: European Commissioner for Agriculture

See also
 2004 European Parliament election in Poland

References

External links
 
 

1954 births
Law and Justice MEPs
Living people
Deputy Marshals of the Sejm of the Third Polish Republic
MEPs for Poland 2004
MEPs for Poland 2004–2009
MEPs for Poland 2009–2014
MEPs for Poland 2014–2019
People from Rawa Mazowiecka

Polish People's Party "Piast" politicians
Polish People's Party MEPs
University of Łódź alumni
European Commissioners 2019–2024